Arturo Erasmo Vidal Pardo (born 22 May 1987) is a Chilean professional footballer who plays as a midfielder for Campeonato Brasileiro Série A club Flamengo and the Chile national team. His displays during his time at Juventus led him to be nicknamed Il Guerriero ("The Warrior"), Rey Arturo ("King Arthur") and La Piranha by the Italian press due to his hard-tackling and aggressive, tenacious style of play.

Vidal started his career with Colo-Colo, where he won three Chilean Primera División titles. He relocated to Europe, where he joined Bundesliga club Bayer Leverkusen and played there for four seasons. He then moved to Juventus in 2011, where he became widely recognized as one of the best midfielders in world football. At Juventus, he won the Scudetti in all four of his seasons and also was integral for them in reaching the 2015 UEFA Champions League Final. Vidal was named to the ten-man shortlist for the 2015 UEFA Best Player in Europe Award following his performances.  On 28 July 2015, Vidal returned to the Bundesliga, joining Bayern Munich and won three consecutive Bundesliga titles. After three years at Munich, he signed for La Liga giants Barcelona, where he won his eighth straight league title. In 2020 he returned to the Serie A to sign for Inter Milan, where he won yet another Serie A title and Coppa Italia.

Vidal has earned over 130 caps for the Chile national team since his debut in 2007, playing in the 2011, 2015, 2019 and 2021 Copa América tournaments, as well as the Copa América Centenario, the 2010 and 2014 FIFA World Cups, and the 2017 FIFA Confederations Cup, helping his nation to Copa América victory in 2015 and 2016.

Early life 
Vidal was born in San Joaquín, a working class commune in the Chilean capital Santiago. His talent was noticed by his uncle, and he later joined the youth squads of local Primera División club Colo-Colo.

Club career

Colo-Colo 
Vidal's professional debut came in the first leg of the 2006 Torneo Apertura final against arch-rivals Universidad de Chile. Vidal came on as a late substitute for Gonzalo Fierro. Colo-Colo would go on to win the game 2–1 and win the championship as well. In the following season (Torneo Clausura) he became a more important part of the squad and would lead Colo-Colo to their second championship win in a row. Vidal scored three goals in Colo-Colo's Copa Sudamericana 2006 campaign. His good showing caught the eye of scouts from various European clubs.

Bayer Leverkusen 
The 2007 Apertura Tournament was Vidal's last with Colo-Colo as he left for Bayer Leverkusen in the summer. Bayer had tracked his progress for some time and his good showing at the U-20 World Cup that year convinced Bayer Leverkusen director of football Rudi Völler to make the trip to Chile to convince the 20-year-old to sign. The two clubs then agreed on a fee of US$11 million with Bayer Leverkusen, paying $7.7 million for 70% ownership of his contract. His transfer broke the previous national record of Matías Fernández's $9 million transfer to Villarreal.

Vidal missed the first game of the season through injury but was soon thrust into the starting line-up and made his debut on 19 August 2007 in the away loss against Hamburger SV. He started in half the season's games and scored his first goal for the club just three games into his Bayer career. He was ever present for the 2008–09 season and played a vital role in Bayer's run to the DFB-Pokal final. On 8 March, he suffered a concussion during the game against VfL Bochum and was out for a month. Upon his return, he scored a goal to break the deadlock in the 4–1 semifinal win over Mainz 05 in the DFB-Pokal, but Bayer eventually lost to Werder Bremen in the final.

The 2010–11 season would be Vidal's last with Bayer. He helped the club to a runner-up finish in the Bundesliga and topped the assist charts for his club with 11 assists, which was joint second in the league. He also contributed two goals in the club's run to the round of 16 of the UEFA Europa League.

Juventus

2011–12 season 
After a good 2010–11 season, Vidal was linked with various clubs, including Bayer's Bundesliga rivals Bayern Munich. On 22 July 2011, however, Vidal joined Serie A club Juventus for €10.5 million on a five-year contract. He made his competitive debut in the opening league game of the season against Parma on 11 September 2011, coming on as a second-half substitute for Alessandro Del Piero; he marked his first appearance with a goal six minutes after his introduction in Juventus' 4–1 win at the club's new stadium. It was initially speculated that he would compete with Claudio Marchisio for a spot alongside Andrea Pirlo, but Juventus manager Antonio Conte instead played all three effectively in a three-man midfield in his 3–5–2 formation. Vidal was an integral part of the 2011–12 Scudetto-winning side that went undefeated the entire season. He contributed seven league goals and three assists, including crucial goals against Napoli and a double against Roma.

2012–13 season 

Vidal began his second season with the club by scoring from a penalty in the 2012 Supercoppa Italiana on 11 August 2012, as Juventus defeated Napoli 4–2 in extra-time at the Beijing National Stadium. On 19 September 2012, Vidal scored his first UEFA Champions League goal in the group stage match away against the defending champions Chelsea. It was a crucial equaliser as Juve finished the game 2–2 after going two goals down in the first half. After helping the club to a second consecutive Serie A title, scoring 10 league goals in the process, and 15 in all competitions, he was voted Player of the Year by registered users on the club website juventus.com.

2013–14 season 
On 27 November 2013, Vidal scored a hat-trick against Copenhagen in the group stage of the Champions League, two penalties and a header. It was his first career hat-trick, and made him the first Juventus player to score three goals in a match in the Champions League since former Juventus player Filippo Inzaghi against Hamburger SV in 2000. He later renewed his contract with Juventus, keeping him at the club until 2017. On 27 February 2014, Vidal scored his first goal in the Europa League with Juventus, opening the scoring in a 2–0 win over Trabzonspor, in the second leg of the round of 16, and helping Juventus to the semi-finals of the competition. Vidal's offensive contribution increased that season, as he managed 11 goals in Serie A and 7 in European competitions, and he was one of the protagonists of Juventus' season as they won their third consecutive league title. His season finished prematurely, however, as he sustained a knee injury.

2014–15 season 
In his fourth season with Juventus, under manager Massimiliano Allegri, Vidal began to play a more advanced role; in addition to his midfield box-to-box role in a 3–5–2 or 4–3–3 formation, Vidal was deployed as an attacking midfielder, supporting the strikers in Allegri's 4–3–1–2 formation, and occasionally as a wide midfielder in a 4–4–2 formation. Vidal scored his first goals of the season by managing a brace in a 3–0 win over Cesena on 24 September 2014. On 30 November, in the Derby della Mole against local rivals Torino, Vidal opened the scoring from a penalty, and later assisted Juventus' second goal in a 2–1 win. On 14 April 2015, in the first leg of the quarter-finals in the 2014–15 UEFA Champions League, Vidal converted a penalty as Juventus defeated Monaco 1–0 at Juventus Stadium.

On 2 May 2015, Vidal scored the only goal of a 1–0 win at Sampdoria, confirming La Vecchia Signora as Serie A champions for the fourth consecutive season. On 20 May, he appeared in Juventus' 2–1 win over Lazio in the 2015 Coppa Italia final, as Juventus captured a domestic double and their tenth Coppa Italia title. On 6 June 2015, Vidal started for Juventus in the 2015 Champions League final as La Vecchia Signora was defeated 3–1 by Barcelona at Berlin's Olympiastadion.

On 15 July 2015, Vidal was named to the ten-man shortlist for the 2015 UEFA Best Player in Europe Award; on 12 August, it was announced that he placed eighth in the 2015 UEFA Best Player in Europe Award.

Bayern Munich

2015–16 season

On 28 July 2015, Vidal returned to the Bundesliga, joining Bayern Munich on a four-year deal for a fee of €37 million plus up to €3 million in bonuses. Vidal made his debut for Bayern four days later in the 2015 DFL-Supercup against VfL Wolfsburg, as a 74th-minute substitute for Thiago. The match finished in a 1–1 draw; Bayern lost in a shootout where Vidal scored. Vidal scored his first goal from the penalty spot against FC Nöttingen in the fifth minute of Bayern's first round DFB-Pokal match. On 19 September, he scored his first league goal for Bayern in a 3–0 away victory over SV Darmstadt 98. On 26 November, Vidal was nominated for the 2015 UEFA Team of the Year. He scored two goals in both first leg and second leg of the Champions League quarter-final tie against S.L. Benfica which helped his side to go through to the semi-final.

2016–17 season
On 15 August 2016, Vidal scored the first goal of the 2016 DFL-Supercup match in a 2–0 victory over their fierce rival Borussia Dortmund. He scored his first ever headed goal for Bayern in a 2–0 victory over Borussia Mönchengladbach on 22 October. On 8 March 2017, he scored two goals in a 5–1 away victory over Arsenal in the Champions League round of sixteen second leg match.  On 12 April, he scored a header and also missed a penalty as his side suffered a 2–1 home defeat against Real Madrid in the Champions League semi-final first leg. In the second leg, he was sent off for receiving a second yellow card after a controversial tackle on Marco Asensio and his side were again defeated and knocked out of the competition by Real Madrid with a 4–2 loss. In the last game of the season, Vidal scored a goal in a 4–1 home victory over SC Freiburg and his side sealed a 25th win of the season and ensured they went a whole league campaign without a defeat at the Allianz Arena for the first time since 2008.

2017–18 season
On 20 September, he scored his first goal of the season in a 3–0 away victory over FC Schalke 04. Vidal scored the only goal of the match in a 1–0 victory over Eintracht Frankfurt and it was his fourth goal in his last four appearances in the league. On 26 October, he made his 100th appearance for the club in a 5–4 victory on penalties against RB Leipzig in the DFB-Pokal second round match. Vidal suffered a season ending knee injury during training on 14 April 2018, and that was his last official match for Bayern. He underwent arthroscopic surgery and was expected back for the 2018–19 Bundesliga preseason.

Barcelona

On 3 August 2018, Barcelona announced an agreement with Bayern Munich for Vidal's transfer. He was officially presented as a Barça player and signed a three-year contract with the club on 6 August 2018. The paper Diario AS announced that the deal was reportedly worth 19 million euros, plus variables, and the paper Sport announced that the deal was reportedly worth 18 million euros, plus 3 million euros in variables. Even so, there wasn't an FC Barcelona statement about the transfer fee and the club's vice-president, Jordi Mestre, announced that the fee will not be disclosed at the request of Bayern Munich.

On 12 August 2018, Vidal made his debut for the club after coming on as a substitute in a 2–1 victory over Sevilla FC as his side won the 2018 Spanish Super Cup. On 28 October, Vidal came on as a substitute in the 84th minute of El Clásico. 3 minutes later, Vidal scored his first ever goal for Barcelona to cap off a 5–1 home win over rivals Real Madrid in La Liga. On 27 April 2019, he assisted the winning goal by Lionel Messi in a 1–0 win against Levante, to secure the La Liga title.

In the 2019–20 season, Vidal mentioned ahead of the Champions League match against his former club Bayern Munich in the quarter-finals: "Bayern will be playing against the best team in the world: Barca", then he added, "They aren't playing against some random Bundesliga team. It's going to be a proper football game. They better be ready for us, because we're looking forward to the challenge." However, the match ended with an 8–2 defeat to Barcelona, which was also his last match with the club.

Inter Milan
On 22 September 2020, Inter Milan and Barcelona confirmed the transfer of Vidal for a fee of €1 million in variables. On 13 January 2021, Vidal scored his first goal for the club against Fiorentina in Coppa Italia from the penalty mark. On 17 January, he scored his first Serie A goal with Inter in a 2–0 win over his former club Juventus. On 11 July 2022, Vidal's contract with Inter was terminated by mutual consent.

Flamengo
On 14 July 2022, Vidal joined Flamengo on a free transfer. Vidal signed an 18 month contract which will see him at the club until December 2023.
He scored his first goal with "Mengao" on 30 July, in a 4-1 win over Atlético Goianiense, on the 20th date of the Brasileirao 2022.

International career

Youth 
Vidal represented Chile at the Under-20 level at the 2007 South American Youth Championship in Paraguay where he was the tournament's second top scorer with six goals. During the tournament he played central midfield and helped the team to qualify for the 2007 FIFA U-20 World Cup where Chile finished in third place with Vidal scoring two goals in the tournament, including the match winner against Portugal in the round of 16.

Senior 
Vidal made his senior debut in a friendly against Venezuela, where Chile won 1–0. He became a regular under Marcelo Bielsa when fit during 2010 World Cup qualifying, playing in 11 matches and scoring a goal. He was then named in the final 23-man squad for the tournament and started in all four of Chile's matches as they were defeated by Brazil in the round of 16. Vidal went on the appear in all of the team's matches at the 2011 Copa América, scoring in the 2–1 group stage defeat of Mexico.

Vidal scored 5 times in 11 appearances for Chile as the team qualified for the 2014 World Cup. At the tournament, he started in three of the La Rojas four fixtures, including the penalty shootout loss to Brazil in the round of 16.

 2015 Copa América 
On 11 June 2015, five days after appearing the 2015 Champions League final for Juventus, Vidal scored the opening goal of the 2015 Copa América from the penalty spot in Chile's 2–0 win over Ecuador at the Estadio Nacional in Santiago, having won the penalty himself when fouled by Miller Bolaños. In the team's next group fixture, Vidal scored twice – a header from a corner and another self-earned penalty – and set up another as the hosts drew 3–3 with Mexico on 15 June. In the final group game, a 5–0 win against Bolivia three days after his drunk driving charge, Vidal and Alexis Sánchez were rested by being substituted at half-time. On 4 July, in the 2015 Copa América final, Vidal scored from a penalty in Chile's 4–1 shoot-out victory over Argentina; in the final, he was voted Man of the Match, and was later named to the 2015 Copa América Team of the Tournament for his performances.

 Copa América Centenario 
On 10 June 2016, Vidal produced a man of the match performance, scoring both goals in a 2–1 win over Bolivia in Chile's second group match of the Copa América Centenario. He provided two assists in Chile's 7–0 victory over Mexico in the quarter-final on 18 June, but also received his second booking of the tournament for a foul on Jesús Dueñas in the 38th minute, which ruled him out of the victorious semi-final match against Colombia. In the final of the tournament, a repeat of the previous year's tournament, against Argentina, the match once again went to a penalty shoot-out following a 0–0 deadlock after extra-time. Vidal missed Chile's first penalty, but his nation won the shoot-out 4–2 to defend the title. Vidal was once again named to the Team of the Tournament for his performances.

 2017 FIFA Confederations Cup 
On 18 June 2017, Vidal produced a man of the match performance in Chile's opening match of the 2017 FIFA Confederations Cup, scoring his nation's first goal in an eventual 2–0 win over Cameroon. He and his team made it through to the final, but were prevented from crowning champions by Germany for losing 1–0.

 2018 World Cup qualifying, retirement, and return 
On 31 August 2017, Arturo Vidal announced that he could retire from the national team after he scored an own goal that resulted a 0–3 loss to Paraguay.  On 11 October, he announced his retirement from international football via of Twitter after losing 3–0 to Brazil in their last qualifier match and failed to qualify for the 2018 FIFA World Cup, but after just 24 hours he reversed his decision saying that he is a "warrior" who would "never abandon" Chile.

In a friendly against Denmark on 27 March 2018, Vidal and Jean Beausejour became the sixth and seventh players to make 100 appearances for Chile.

 2019 Copa América 
In the quarter-finals of the 2019 Copa América against Colombia on 28 June, Vidal had a goal disallowed in regulation time by VAR for offside; following a 0–0 draw, he scored in the resulting penalty shoot-out to help Chile to a 5–4 victory and advanced to the semi-finals of the competition. In the third-place match against Argentina on 6 July, Vidal scored from a penalty once again in an eventual 2–1 defeat.

 Style of play 

A tactically versatile and hard-working player, Vidal is capable of playing anywhere in midfield, and in several different formations. He initially played in several different defensive and midfield roles in his early years, before eventually coming into his own in the centre, with Juventus, as either a "mezzala" or box-to-box midfielder, roles in which he is capable of assisting his teammates in both defence and attack. Throughout his career, he has also been deployed as a central defender, as a defensive midfielder, as an attacking midfielder, or even on the wing, due to his crossing ability. He is also capable of playing as a full-back or wing-back on either side of the pitch, while with the Chile national team, he has even played in a more advanced role on occasion, positioned as a centre-forward or striker, but effectively functioning as a false-9. He has also been used as a second striker, and as a false attacking midfielder on occasion.

It was these displays for Juventus that led him to be nicknamed Il Guerriero ("The Warrior"), Rey Arturo ("King Arthur") and La Piranha by the Italian press for his hard-tackling and aggressive, tenacious style of play. Vidal is a complete midfielder, known for his marking, positional sense, tackling, and anticipation, attributes which allow him to be effective at intercepting passes, winning back possession, and subsequently starting an attack. He is also gifted with good technique, pace, and stamina, as well as good vision, good distribution, a powerful shot from distance, and an eye for goal. Having been the first-choice penalty shooter for Juventus, he is also an accurate penalty kick taker. Due to his strength and physical characteristics, as well as his ability to make late attack runs from behind into the penalty area, he is also effective in the air. All these qualities have enabled him to become one of the leading exponents of his position.

At Juventus, Vidal became an integral part of the Bianconeri alongside teammates Claudio Marchisio and Andrea Pirlo in the club's three-man midfield, and has made a name for himself as one of the best players in the world in his position; Vidal credited his development and maturity as a player to club legends Pirlo and Gianluigi Buffon. Vidal is also considered one of the most complete midfielders in the world due to his tackling abilities and his ability to support the team in both defence and attack at a high level. In 2013, Bloomberg ranked him the 11th-best player in Europe.

 Sponsorship 
On 5 July 2013, EA Sports announced that they had featured Vidal on the Central and South American cover of FIFA 14, alongside global cover star Lionel Messi. The cover, however, would not be featured in the Brazilian version of the game.

 Personal life 
On 16 June 2015, during the 2015 Copa América, Vidal suffered minor injuries when he crashed his Ferrari while under the influence of alcohol in Santiago. He left the hospital in a police car and was summoned to court to face charges for drunk driving. On 8 July 2015, Vidal was given a two-year driving ban, however he was allowed to continue playing in the Copa América that year. 

His cousin, Gonzalo Vásquez, is a former footballer who is now an engineer. 

The professional footballer Daniel Malhue is married to his younger sister, Victoria, and they have a son. 

In March 2020, Vidal and fellow Chilean footballer Gary Medel, donated to the Chilean Red Cross under an initiative to combat the COVID-19 pandemic in Chile.

 Career statistics 
 Club 

 International 

Scores and results list Chile's goal tally first.
	

 Honours Colo-Colo Primera División de Chile: 2006-A, 2006-C, 2007-AJuventus Serie A: 2011–12, 2012–13, 2013–14, 2014–15
 Coppa Italia: 2014–15
 Supercoppa Italiana: 2012, 2013
 UEFA Champions League runner-up: 2014–15Bayern Munich Bundesliga: 2015–16, 2016–17, 2017–18
 DFB-Pokal: 2015–16
 DFL-Supercup: 2016, 2017Barcelona La Liga: 2018–19
 Supercopa de España: 2018Inter Milan Serie A: 2020–21
 Coppa Italia: 2021–22
 Supercoppa Italiana: 2021Flamengo Copa do Brasil: 2022
 Copa Libertadores: 2022Chile Copa América: 2015, 2016 
FIFA Confederations Cup runner-up: 2017Individual'
 Bundesliga Team of the Season: 2010–11, 2015–16
 Best Chilean Player Abroad: 2011
 Juventus Player of the Year: 2012–13
 Serie A Team of the Year: 2012–13, 2013–14
 Midfielder of the Season by Goal.com: 2012–13
 ESM Team of the Year: 2013–14
 Copa América Team of the Tournament: 2015, 2016, 2019
 MasterCard 2015 Copa América Final Man of the Match
 Chilean Footballer of the Year: 2016

See also
List of footballers with 100 or more caps

References

External links 

 Profile at the FC Barcelona website
 
 
 
 
 
 

1987 births
Living people
Footballers from Santiago
Chilean footballers
Association football midfielders
Colo-Colo footballers
Bayer 04 Leverkusen players
Juventus F.C. players
FC Bayern Munich footballers
FC Barcelona players
Inter Milan players
CR Flamengo footballers
Chilean Primera División players
Bundesliga players
Serie A players
La Liga players
Campeonato Brasileiro Série A players
Chile under-20 international footballers
Chile youth international footballers
Chile international footballers
2010 FIFA World Cup players
2011 Copa América players
2014 FIFA World Cup players
2015 Copa América players
Copa América Centenario players
2017 FIFA Confederations Cup players
2019 Copa América players
2021 Copa América players
Copa América-winning players
Copa Libertadores-winning players
FIFA Century Club
Chilean expatriate footballers
Chilean expatriate sportspeople in Germany
Chilean expatriate sportspeople in Italy
Chilean expatriate sportspeople in Spain
Chilean expatriate sportspeople in Brazil
Expatriate footballers in Germany
Expatriate footballers in Italy
Expatriate footballers in Spain
Expatriate footballers in Brazil